Jason Heatley (born 21 February 1972) is a former Australian rules football full-forward, who played for  and  during the 1990s.

Early career
Heatley started out in the Diamond Valley Football League in Victoria with 118 goals for North Heidelberg and was zoned to Fitzroy who rejected him as too slight for full-forward after playing six practice matches before the 1993 season, during three of which he was stationed at full-back. Consequently, he was recruited by Subiaco, where he kicked 111 goals in 1993, winning the Bernie Naylor Medal and kicking the highest aggregate of goals since Warren Ralph kicked 128 in 1983.

Heatley caught the attention of AFL recruiters, and was picked up in the 1993 AFL Draft by the West Coast Eagles, but the same fears that derailed him from signing with Fitzroy prevented him breaking into the strong Eagles team. After three seasons on the list for just three games, Heatley was delisted at the end of 1996. Heatley continued nonetheless to kick goals for Subiaco: 81 in 1994, 123 in 1995 (winning his second Bernie Naylor Medal) and 55 in 1996.

St Kilda career
St Kilda picked Heatley up in the 1996 AFL Draft, and he debuted for the Saints in 1997. Heatley kicked 73 goals in 1997, and was known for his set-shot accuracy in front of goal. He led St Kilda’s goalkicking and became a vital part of a St Kilda team. In his first game for St Kilda he kicked 5 goals against Collingwood in Round 3. Heatley also kicked a personal best of 9.1 goals that year in Round 14 where St Kilda won by 9 goals against North Melbourne at Waverley Park.

Heatley played in 17 of 22 matches in the 1997 AFL Premiership Season home and away rounds in which St Kilda Football Club qualified in first position for the 1997 AFL Finals Series, winning the club’s second Minor Premiership and first McClelland Trophy.

Heatley played in the 1997 AFL Grand Final in which St Kilda was defeated by 31 points. He was the third highest goalkicker in the AFL that year, behind Tony Modra and Saverio Rocca.

In 1998 Heatley had an average year, the inconsistency of the team reflected his performances. However, he still won the Saints’ goalkicking, albeit with only 48 goals for the year.

In 1999 and 2000 Heatley’s AFL career started a downward spiral. He managed only thirteen games in 1999 for a return of 27 goals, and in 2000 he played seven games for only fifteen goals, after which St. Kilda, trying to rebuild after a disastrous season with only two wins under general expectation of at least a finals berth, delisted him.

Post AFL career
Heatley returned to North Heidelberg in 2001 and won the Diamond Valley goalkicking award by kicking 110 goals.

Heatley had a two-year stint with the Tassie Devils in the VFL before coaching Warrnambool in the Hampden league. Heatley returned to Melbourne and coached Northcote Park in the Northern Football League (Australia)| Heatley coached the Cougars for three seasons  2012, 2013 & 2014 In 2012 Heatley was awarded the ACFA coach of the Northern Region.

References

External links
 
 
 WAFL Player Profile

Subiaco Football Club players
1972 births
Living people
St Kilda Football Club players
West Coast Eagles players
North Heidelberg Football Club players
Australian rules footballers from Melbourne
Warrnambool Football Club players
Warrnambool Football Club coaches
 Tasmanian Devils Football Club players
People from Reservoir, Victoria